Colonel Francis Augustus Fane (1824–1893,) was an English officer in the British Army who raised the Peshawar Light Horse during the Indian Mutiny. Fane was also a noted traveller, diarist, artist as well as in later years a successful banker.

Early life
Fane was born in 1824 into the prosperous Fane family in Fulbeck Lincolnshire. Fourth son of the Reverend Edward Fane of Fulbeck Hall and Maria Hodges.  His younger brothers include Henry Hamlyn-Fane and General Walter Fane.

Military service
Francis joined the 25th Regiment of Foot where he served in Antigua and Canada and where later he was ADC to his Uncle Major-General Mildmay Fane. When the Indian mutiny broke out in 1857, Francis Fane raised a troop of cavalry called the Peshawar Light Horse, made up mainly of loyal Hindu sepoys with which he fought a guerrilla campaign against the insurgents. He campaigned throughout the Mutiny with a church organ with which he roused both troops and civilians alike.

Fane is not to be confused with his brother general Walter Fane who raised Fane's Horse nor with his brother in law Henry Princep Fane who undertook a famous and well documented escape from Indian Mutineers at Jaunpore.

Later life
In 1862 his father died and Francis Fane inherited the Fulbeck Hall estate in Lincolnshire. Fane left the army ranked a Colonel and became a successful Banker as a partner in Praed Fane and Co., based in Nottingham. Fane was a keen musician, artist and engraver as well as diarist.

He died in 1893 from a fall whilst hunting and was buried in Fulbeck Lincolnshire.

Family
Francis Fane married his first cousin Augusta Fane daughter of William Fane of Bombay and Cape Town. They had four children Mildmay, Hester, Rachel, and Nevile and both his sons died on active service in the British army.

References

1824 births
1893 deaths
King's Own Scottish Borderers officers
British military personnel of the Indian Rebellion of 1857
Francis
Military personnel from Lincolnshire
People from South Kesteven District